The Croatian Armed Forces were formed in 1944 with the uniting of the Croatian Home Guard (Domobrani) and the Ustaše militia in the Independent State of Croatia. It was established by the fascist regime of Ante Pavelić in the Independent State of Croatia (NDH), an Axis puppet state in Yugoslavia during World War II.

The Croatian Armed Forces (HOS) was reorganized in November 1944 to combine the units of the Ustaše and Domobrani into eighteen divisions, comprising 13 infantry, two mountain, two assault and one replacement Croatian divisions, each with its own organic artillery and other support units. There were also several armoured units, equipped in late 1944 with 20 Pz IIIN and 15 Pz IVF and H medium tanks. From early 1945, the Croatian divisions were allocated to various German corps and by March 1945 were holding the Southern Front. Securing the rear areas were some 32,000 men of the Croatian Gendarmerie (Hrvatsko Oružništvo), organised into 5 Police Volunteer Regiments plus 15 independent battalions, equipped with standard light infantry weapons, including mortars.

By the end of March, 1945, it was obvious to the Army command that, although the front remained intact, they would eventually be defeated by sheer lack of ammunition. For this reason, the decision was made to retreat across the border into the Austrian part of the Third Reich, in order to surrender to the British forces advancing north from Italy.

Croatian Home Guard

Ustaše Militia

Croatian Gendarmerie 
The Croatian Gendarmerie (Hrvatsko Oružništvo) was formed on 30 April 1941 as rural police under Major-General Milan Miesler. By September 1943, there were 18,000 men in seven regional regiments. These were divided into 23 companies (one per county plus one for Zagreb). The companies were subdivided into 142 district platoons, each with several posts. In early 1942, a three-battalion Combined Gendarmie Regiment, in July redesignated Petrinja Brigade, was established for anti-Partisan operations in Slavonia.Twelve of the independent Police Volunteer Battalions formed the Croatian Gendarmerie Division in 1945.

History

Organization

Marching order at end of 1944 

1. Poglavnik Bodyguard Division
1. Croatian Assault Division 
Commander: General Ante Moškov
Headquarters: Zagreb
2. Croatian Infantry Division 
Commander: General Mirko Gregurić
Headquarters: Zagreb
3. Croatian Infantry Division
Commander: General Stjepan Mifek
Headquarters: Vinkovci
4. Croatian Infantry Division
Commander: General Antun Nardelli
Headquarters: Dvor na Uni
5. Croatian Assault Division 
Commander: General Rafael Boban
Headquarters: Bjelovar
6. Croatian Infantry Division 
Commander: General Vladimir Metikoš
Headquarters: Banja Luka
7. Croatian Mountain Division
Commander: General Stjepan Perčić
Headquarters: Nova Kapela, Batrina
8. Croatian Infantry Division
Commander: General Roman Domanik
Headquarters: Sarajevo
9. Croatian Mountain Division
Commander: General Božidar Zorn
Headquarters: Mostar
10. Croatian Infantry Division
Commander: General Ivan Tomašević
Headquarters: Bihać
11. Croatian Infantry Division
Commander: Colonel Juraj Rukavina
Headquarters: Gospić
12. Croatian Infantry Division 
Commander: Colonel Slavko Cesarić
Headquarters: Brčko
13. Croatian Infantry Division 
Commander: General Tomislav Rolf
Headquarters: Karlovac
14. Croatian Infantry Division
Commander: Colonel Jaroslav Šotola
Headquarters: Brod na Savi
15. Croatian Infantry Division
Commander: General Zorko Čudina
Headquarters: Doboj
16. Croatian Replacement Division
Commander: General Milivoj Durbešić
Headquarters: Zagreb
18. Croatian Infantry Division

Fate of Commanders

Executed
Ante Moškov 
Mirko Gregurić 
Stjepan Mifek 
Antun Nardelli 
Vladimir Metikoš
Roman Domanik
Božidar Zorn
Ivan Tomašević
Juraj Rukavina
Zorko Čudina
Mijo Škoro

Unclear
Rafael Boban
Jaroslav Šotola
Milivoj Durbešić

Emigrated
Stjepan Peričić
Slavko Cesarić

Committed suicide
Tomislav Rolf

Ranks and insignia

References

Bibliography
 
 
 
 

Military of the Independent State of Croatia